Beste Bereket (born 2 July 1982) is a Turkish actress. She appeared in more than twelve films since 2005.

Selected filmography

References

External links 

1982 births
Living people
Turkish film actresses
Best Actress Golden Orange Award winners